Bai Ji Guan or Bai Jiguan (pronounced ) is a very light Si Da Ming Cong tea, a well-known oolong tea of Wuyi, in Fujian, China.

Legend has it that the name of this tea (which translates to 'white rooster' or more literally 'white cockscomb') was given by a monk in memorial of a courageous rooster that sacrificed his life while protecting his baby from an eagle. Touched by the display of courage and love, the monk buried the rooster and from that spot, the  tea bush grew.

Unlike most Wuyi teas, the leaves of this tea are yellowish to light green rather than dark green or brown.

The flavour is also quite different from the other Wuyi oolongs, which tend to be otherwise very similar as a group. Like most Wuyi oolongs, it sits in the highly oxidized end of the oolong tea spectrum, though in the lower range of oxidization for a Wuyi tea, which tend to be 60-80% oxidized.

See also
 Si Da Ming Cong

References

External links
 
Bai Ji Guan oolong tea 

Wuyi tea
Chinese teas
Chinese tea grown in Fujian
Oolong tea
Cultivars of tea grown in China